State Highway 325 (SH 325) is a  state highway in Garfield County, Colorado, United States, that connects Colorado State Highway 13 (SH 13), north of Rifle, with Rifle Mountain Park.

Route description

SH 325 runs , starting at a junction with  SH 13 north of Rifle.  The highway goes north to Rifle Gap State Park.  From there it follows East Rifle Creek east and then north to Rifle Falls State Park.  After passing the falls it continues north along the creek, ending at the entrance to Rifle Mountain Park.

Major intersections

See also 

 List of state highways in Colorado
 Valley Curtain

References

External links

325
Transportation in Garfield County, Colorado